The Widawa is a river in Poland, a right-bank tributary of the Oder River. Towns along the Widawa include Namysłów, Bierutów, and Wrocław.

Rivers of Poland